Sean Kanan  Perelman; born November 2, 1966) is an American actor, producer, and author, best known for his portrayals of Mike Barnes (in The Karate Kid Part III and Cobra Kai), A. J. Quartermaine (on General Hospital), and Deacon Sharpe (on The Bold and the Beautiful and The Young and the Restless).

Early life
Kanan was born Sean Perelman in Cleveland, Ohio to Dale and Michelle Perelman. His family later relocated to New Castle, Pennsylvania. He attended Mercersburg Academy in Pennsylvania, Boston University and UCLA where he earned a degree in political science.

Career

The Karate Kid Part III
Kanan's first notable role was that of villain Mike Barnes in the 1989 film The Karate Kid Part III directed by Academy Award winning Director, John Avildsen.

As a teenager, Kanan studied Shotokan karate under Sensei William Stoner. By the time he landed the role, Kanan had a good foundation of Japanese Karate which would be essential for portraying the central antagonist of Daniel LaRusso played by Ralph Macchio. He trained in Shitō-ryū at a school run by Karate master Fumio Demura and with stunt coordinator and Tang Soo Do master Pat E. Johnson.

During filming, he suffered internal bleeding after injuring his omentum, a membrane that connects the stomach with other organs, supplying them with blood along with physically protecting them. Kanan collapsed at a Las Vegas hotel four days after shooting the scene and underwent life-saving surgery.

Television & Film

1990–2000
The following year, he starred on the Fox television series The Outsiders, Executive Produced by Francis Ford Coppola. In 1993, Kanan joined the ABC soap opera General Hospital as A. J. Quartermaine  the troubled son of Dr. Alan and Dr. Monica Quartermaine. Kanan was nominated for an award in the Outstanding Newcomer category by Soap Opera Digest for his believable portrayal of the fictional character whose storylines often centered on an ongoing battle with alcoholism. He left the series in 1997 and returned in 2012 for the 50th anniversary of the show. Kanan's last appearance was on April 23, 2014, after his on-screen television character was killed. In 1999, Kanan joined the cast of Aaron Spelling's NBC soap opera Sunset Beach as Jude Cavanaugh and remained with the show until its cancellation later that year.

2000–Present
In 2000 he joined the cast of the CBS soap opera The Bold and the Beautiful as Deacon Sharpe, playing a character that was originally conceived as a short-term villain, but would later prove to be the basis for a popular, on-going storyline for the show.He would remain with the show until 2005 when he opted for recurring status while his on-screen character served a prison sentence for obstructing justice. Kanan also starred in several feature films in tandem with his television career. He wrote and executive-produced Chasing Holden, which was distributed by Lionsgate,and starred Kanan along with DJ Qualls. In 2002 he hosted the Miss World Pageant in London, and in 2006 competed in the third season of Ballando con le Stelle, the Italian version of Dancing with the Stars.

On July 10, 2009, Kanan reprised his role as Deacon Sharpe on the CBS sister soap opera The Young and the Restless. While appearing on The Young and the Restless, he starred in the 2009 Indie film Abracadabra, which was directed by Julie Pacino (Al Pacino's daughter) and was screened at the Cannes Film Festival. In May 2010, Kanan starred in My Trip to the Dark Side, written and directed by Shane Stanley. He later starred in the 2011 sequel My Trip Back to the Dark Side.  Upon leaving The Young and the Restless in January 2012, Kanan reprised his role as Deacon Sharpe on The Bold and the Beautiful, noting that Deacon is his favorite of all the characters he has played due in part to the writing of Bradley Bell.

Studio City 
In 2019 Kanan created the Emmy Award-winning digital drama series Studio City, directed by Timothy Woodward Jr., as a somewhat autobiographical love letter to the Daytime Soaps.
Kanan stars as Sam Stevens, who portrays Dr. Pierce Hartley on the show-with-in-a show “Hearts on Fire”, along with Soap veterans Tristan Rogers, Carolyn Hennesy, Sarah Joy Brown, Patrika Darbo, and Scott Turner Schofield, the first openly transgender actor on Daytime TV. The episodes are penned by Kanan, along with Michele Kanan, Timothy Woodward Jr., and Lauren de Normandie (season one).  The series explores issues like #meToo sexual harassment, ageism, gender identity and surprise paternity with enough levity to keep the story moving.  Studio City was truly a family affair, with Kanan's Emmy-nominated wife Michele Kanan writing / producing and her daughter (Sean's step-daughter), Juliet Vega starring as Sam's surprise love child. Studio City is streaming on Amazon Prime.

Cobra Kai
Kanan reprised his role as Mike Barnes from The Karate Kid III for the fifth season of Cobra Kai.

Other ventures
 Writing 
In 2011, Kanan wrote The Modern Gentleman; Cooking and Entertaining with Sean Kanan, published by Dunham Books. He shared many of his favorite recipes, but also took the opportunity to help "rebrand men" by offering tips on etiquette, manners, and entertaining for special occasions. The goal of the book is to inspire people to be the best they can be, to get in touch with their authentic selves and to use cooking as a conduit for developing connections.

In 2019, the book Success Factor X, co-written by Kanan and motivational speaker Jill Liberman, was released. The book, published by Plain Sight Publishing, is described as a collection of strategies and secrets from a diverse group of high achievers ranging from billionaire entrepreneur Mark Cuban to hip-hop icons Run-DMC
In 2021, Sean wrote Way of the COBRA in which he, as Sensei, inspires and instructs students on techniques to define their most authentic and successful self. The acronym COBRA stands for character, optimization, balance, respect, and abundance. He shares some of his own experiences from landing the breakout role of Mike Barnes in the Karate Kid III'', to how he almost lost the role and his life in the process.

Daytime Emmy and Walk of Fame 
Kanan's career has been acknowledged through numerous industry awards including the Daytime Emmy for his series Studio City. In 2016, Kanan received the 400th star on the Walk of Fame in Palm Springs.

Personal life
Sean and Michele Kanan married in July 2012. He has a daughter by his prior relationship and Michele has four children of her own.

Kanan is an active advocate for anti-bullying and an Ambassador for the organization Boo 2 Bullying. His charities include the American Cancer Society, Project Angel Food, and his tour with the USO entertaining troops in Bosnia.

Filmography

Film

Television

Awards and nominations

References

External links 
 
Sean Kanan AKA Mike Barnes in The Karate Kid III - Kicking It With the Koves (May 26, 2022) - Martin Kove, Jesse Kove, Rachel Kove

1966 births
American male soap opera actors
American male television actors
Living people
Male actors from Pennsylvania
20th-century American male actors
21st-century American male actors
American male film actors
Daytime Emmy Award for Outstanding Digital Daytime Drama Series winners